Jeff Broadstreet (born November 7, 1960) is an American film director.

Broadstreet directed the 2006 remake of Night of the Living Dead (1968), titled Night of the Living Dead 3D and its prequel, Night of the Living Dead 3D: Re-Animation.

Broadstreet has also directed the films Sexbomb (1989) and Dr. Rage (2005). He was also executive producer on the 2010 documentary American Grindhouse.

References

External links

American film directors
American male screenwriters
American film producers
1960 births
Living people